The black oreo (Allocyttus niger) is an oreo of the family Oreosomatidae, found around Australia and New Zealand between latitudes of between 43°S and 55°S at depths of between 560 and 1,300 m.

Size

The black oreo is very similar in shape to the warty oreo.

References

 

Oreosomatidae
Taxa named by Gavin Digby James
Taxa named by Tadashi Inada
Taxa named by Izumi Nakamura
Fish described in 1988